Húnabyggð is a municipality in the north of Iceland, which was formed with the merger of Blönduós and Húnavatnshreppur. An vote was held in February 2022 where 97.8% of Blönduós inhabitants and 62.3% of Húnavatnshreppur inhabitants voted with the merge. The merger was finalized in the municipality elections in March 2022.

Húnabyggð is among the largest municipalities of Iceland in terms of area and reaches from Húnaflói, where Blönduós is situated, to the interior, where Langjökull and Hofsjökull are situated. Blönduvirkjun hydropower plant is situated in the municipality.

References

Municipalities of Iceland
Populated places in Northwestern Region (Iceland)
States and territories established in 2022